The Voice of Kazakhstan (Kazakh : Qazaqstan дауысы / Russian : Голос Казахстана) is the Kazakh format of the popular television series called The Voice. It was created by the executive producer of Fear Factor, John De Mol. It was previously brocasted on the Kazakhstan channel also known as Qazaqstan TV. The language of the show was in Kazakh but due to the loss of the series to Perviy Kanal Evraziya it would later be in Russian. The judges from season 1-3 were Malina Saduaqsova, Almas Kishenbaev, Nurlan Alban and Medeu Arynbaev but then in Seasons 4 it was Ali Okapov, Eva Becher, Nurlan Abdullin and Zhanna Orynbasarova. The host of the series was Azamat Saltybady.

The revival of the show was commissioned again by Qazaqstan TV . The fifth season was aired on September 4, 2021. The show is renewed for a sixth season to air soon.

 Series overview Warning: the following table presents a significant amount of different colors.

Kids' Version

After the regular version was acquired by the Perviy Kanal Evraziya, it was announced to have a Kid's Version of the show, with the name "Голос Дети Kазахстана". The first had three judges, named Ali Okapov, Eva Becher and Zhanna Orynbasarova. It was won by Daniil Yun from team Ali. Participation is only for contestants between the ages of 8 and 14.

The revival of the series was announced by Qazaqstan TV, under the name "Qazaqstan дауысы. Балалар"  after the airing of the fifth season of regular version.. This season, it will have the four coaches named, Jubanish Jeksen, Dastan Orazbekov, Zhanar Dugalova and will have the regular version coach, Arapbayeva Marzhan.

Airing of the new season began on March 26, 2022.

Warning: the following table presents a significant amount of different colors.

References

Kazakhstani television shows
Kazakh